Plague Column, also known as Holy Trinity Monument, is a Baroque monument in Timișoara's Union Square. It was placed in the central square of the city, then known as Domplatz, in 1740 as an ex voto of chamber councilor . The monument belongs to the typology of plague columns, widespread in the Baroque era throughout the South German, Bohemian and Hungarian space.

History 
The statue commemorates the end of the plague epidemic that devastated the entire Banat between 1731 and 1738. During the epidemic, in Timișoara alone, more than 1,300 people lost their lives (one-sixth of the city's population). The epidemic was brought to Banat by Austrian imperial troops, and among the dead in Timișoara were six mayors. A similar monument can be found in Teremia Mare, also in Timiș County.

The monument was created between 1739 and 1740 by sculptor Georg Raphael Donner in Vienna and transported via Danube–Tisza–Bega Canal to Timișoara. The entire project was overseen and funded by chamber councilor , whose wife died during the epidemic. The statue was on display for 12 years in front of Deschan Palace, on the site of the current Bega Shopping Center. In 1755, at the insistence of Empress Maria Theresa, the statue, dismantled into pieces, was placed in its current location.

Description 
The obelisk-shaped monument was placed on a small base, and was later surrounded by a short fence.

Above the volutes are the statues of Sts. Sebastian, Roch and Charles Borromeo. In the upper register, there are three more statues of antipestilential saints: John of Nepomuk, Barbara and Francis Xavier (presumably). The surfaces of the column itself are covered with clouds, and on the central part of the main side of the column appears an empty baroque shield, provided on its upper part with a crown. The Ionic capital of the column is also decorated with festoons, and above it lies a complex cornice, on the central part of which was carved a simple floral decoration.

The central representation of the column is the group of stone carved statues of the Holy Trinity, one of the most widespread variants of the plague columns. Between God the Father and Jesus seated on a throne, the Mother of God kneels with her hands clasped in prayer. The Father and the Son are just getting ready to place the crown on Mary's head. Above the three characters also appears the wrought iron figure of the dove of the Holy Spirit.

References 

Buildings and structures in Timișoara
Buildings and structures completed in 1740
Baroque architecture in Romania
Statues in Romania
Monumental columns
Baroque sculptures
Marian and Holy Trinity columns
Historic monuments in Timiș County